The 1972–73 Alberta Oilers season was the Oilers' first season, as one of twelve inaugural franchises of the now-defunct World Hockey Association (WHA).

Regular season
The Oilers victory over the Ottawa Nationals on October 11, 1972, was the first game in league history, with Ron Anderson scoring the first goal.

Jim Harrison led the team in scoring, with 39 goals and 86 points. On January 30, 1973, in an 11–3 defeat of the New York Raiders, Harrison set a major professional hockey record with 10 points (3G, 7A) in a single game.  That feat was later matched by Darryl Sittler on February 7, 1976, in a National Hockey League game.

The Oilers posted a winning record in the regular season, with 38 wins, 37 losses and 3 ties.  The Minnesota Fighting Saints finished with an identical record, so a single game playoff was contested to decide fourth place in the Western Division.  The Fighting Saints defeated the Oilers 4–2 on a neutral site rink (in Calgary), ending the Oilers season.

Season standings

Playoffs
The Oilers and the Minnesota Fighting Saints were tied at the end of the season. They had the same number of victories and points, and they had both won four games against each other. Subsequently, it was decided that the two teams would play a one-game playoff to decide the final spot in the playoffs, to be played in Calgary. The Oilers lost the game, and the Fighting Saints went on to play in the Quarterfinals.

Player statistics

Skaters
Note: GP = Games played; G = Goals; A = Assists; Pts = Points; PIM = Penalties In Minutes

†Denotes player traded to the Oilers mid-season.
‡Denotes player traded away mid-season.
Statistics for all players reflect only games played with the Oilers.

Goaltenders
Note: GP = Games played; TOI = Time on ice (minutes); W = Wins; L = Losses; T = Ties; GA = Goals against; SO = Shutouts; SV% = Save percentage; GAA = Goals against average

Awards and records 
Four Oilers were selected to play in the mid-season All-Star Game on January 6:
 Jack Norris (G)
 Al Hamilton (D)
 Bob Wall (D)
 Jim Harrison (C)

Milestones

Transactions

Draft picks
The WHA General Player Draft was held on February 12–13, 1972 to stock each new WHA team with their initial rosters.  The Oilers selected four NHL players with their "priority" selections:
 Norm Ullman, C, Toronto Maple Leafs
 Bobby Clarke, C, Philadelphia Flyers
 Bruce MacGregor, RW, New York Rangers
 Phil Myre, G, Montreal Canadiens
Ullman and MacGregor would eventually play for the Oilers, but not for the 1972–73 season. Both were Edmonton-born players who finished their playing careers with the Oilers after long NHL careers.

The Oilers selected an additional 96 players in subsequent rounds of the draft.  Of those, 22 players would play for the Oilers, 16 in the 1972–73 season.

Trades

Free Agents
 Bill Hicke signed September 1972

References

Alberta
Alberta
Edmonton Oilers seasons